"Shoot All the Clowns" is the second and last single from Bruce Dickinson's second solo album, Balls to Picasso, released in August 1994.

On the Anthology DVD interview, Dickinson revealed that the song was the last one completed for Balls to Picasso on the insistence of the record label. Due to the complicated production, the record label was skeptical of the album's success. Bruce made the song on the simple instruction that it was supposed to sound similar to Aerosmith.

Track listing 
CD One
 "Shoot All The Clowns"  (Bruce Dickinson/Roy Z) –  04:16 
 "Tibet"  (Bruce Dickinson) –  03:01 
 "Tears of the Dragon (First Bit-Long Bit-Last Bit)"  (Bruce Dickinson) –  08:18

CD Two
 "Shoot All The Clowns (Extended Mix)"  (Bruce Dickinson/Roy Z) –  05:39
 "Cadillac Gas Mask"  (Bruce Dickinson) –  04:07
 "No Way Out...Continued"  (Bruce Dickinson/J. Crichton/R. Baker) –  05:17

Credits
 Bruce Dickinson – vocals
 Roy Z – Guitar
 Eddie Cassillas – Bass guitar
 Dave Ingraham - Drums
 Dean Ortega - Backing vocals

Chart positions

References 

1994 singles
Bruce Dickinson songs
Songs written by Bruce Dickinson
1994 songs
Music videos directed by Howard Greenhalgh